The Council for Spreading President Mahmoud Ahmadinejad's Thoughts is an official high-council, established by Mahmoud Ahmadinejad's government in order to spread the philosophy, ideology and sociology of President Mahmoud Ahmadinejad.

The aim of the council "to define and guard over the thought and works of the president," according to Ham-Mihan newspaper and the ISNA news agency.

Structure of the council
The council is a government body composed of 15 members and headed by Abdol-Reza Sheikholeslami, secretary of the office of president. The members include:

Gholam Hossein Elham (Government's spokesmen)
Hossein Saffar Harandi (cultural minister)
Mojtaba Samareh Hashemi (advisor to the president)
Ruhollah Hosseinian (advisor to the president; died 2020)
Haj Ali-Akbari
Sadegh Mahsouli
Hassan Rahimpour Azghadi
Ali Motahhari
Ali Akbar Ash'ari
Ali-Akbar Javanfekr
Mohammad Ali Fathollahi
Mohammad Shafiee-far
Mohammad Jafar Behdad
Mojtaba Zarei (secretary of the council)

References

Mahmoud Ahmadinejad